The End of the River  is a British drama film made in Belém, Brazil about a Brazilian Indian boy who leaves the jungle to the city, where he is accused of murder. It was directed by Derek Twist and written by Wolfgang Wilhelm, based on a novel by Desmond Holdridge. The film stars Sabu and Bibi Ferreira.

The film was produced by Powell & Pressburger, the famous filmmaking duo known as "The Archers". It was filmed mainly on location, along the upper sections of the Amazon River.

Cast

Sabu as Manoel
Bibi Ferreira as Teresa
Esmond Knight as Dantos
Basil Appleby as Ship's Officer
Dennis Arundell as Coutinho
Nicolette Bernard as Dona Serafina
Minto Cato as Dona Paula
Antoinette Cellier as Conceicao
Raymond Lovell as Porpino
James Hayter as Chico
Maurice Denham as Defence Counsel
Eva Hudson as Maria Goncalves
Milo Sperber as Ze
Nino Rossini as Feliciano
Torin Thatcher as Lisboa
Andrea Malindrinos as Officer of India Protection Soc
Alan Wheatley as Irgoyen
James Harcourt as the judge
Arthur Goullet as the pedlar
Peter Illing as Ship's Agent
Robert Douglas as Jones
Orlando Martins as Harrigan
Charles Hawtrey as Raphael
Zena Marshall as Santa
Russell Napier as the padre

Critical reception
The Radio Times described the film as "A curio," and concluded, "Despite a good cast and the Brazilian locations, the results are both confusing and disappointing"; and TV Guide similarly found "A confusing, mediocre film shot in Brazil, with little to recommend it to audiences elsewhere"; whereas Britmovie found more to admire, and wrote, "Sabu is well suited for the role with his Indian good looks. He executes a credible performance...Bibi Ferreira is stunningly beautiful as his love interest...Esmond Knight, Orlando Martins, Robert Douglas, and Torin Thatcher all turn in solid performances...Even though parts of the story remain weak, the scenery definitely makes up for it. Christopher Challis is the cinematographer and he successfully portrays the life of the natives in the lush subtropical forests in Brazil."

References

External links
 
  Full synopsis and film stills (and clips viewable from UK libraries).
 Reviews and articles at the Powell & Pressburger Pages

1947 films
Films set in Brazil
Films based on American novels
Films by Powell and Pressburger
Films directed by Derek Twist
Films shot at Pinewood Studios
British black-and-white films